Buck Lake is a hamlet in central Alberta, Canada within the County of Wetaskiwin No. 10. It is located on the shore of Buck Lake.

Demographics 

See also 
List of communities in Alberta
List of designated places in Alberta
List of hamlets in Alberta

References 

Hamlets in Alberta
Designated places in Alberta
County of Wetaskiwin No. 10